The Luxembourg School of Business (LSB) is the only accredited graduate business school in Luxembourg. LSB offers a part-time Master in Business Administration ("weekend MBA"), a full-time Master in Management, as well as specialized programs for individuals companies.

Founded in 2014, it is the first business school in Luxembourg which had to meet the requirements of the new legal framework put in place in 2016, focused on raising the quality standards. LSB is accredited by the Luxembourg Ministry of Higher Education and Research via a ministerial decree dated as of 29 August 2017 for the duration of five years.

Also accredited as a training provider inside the Lifelong Learning initiative  of the L'Institut national pour le développement de la formation professionnelle continue  of Luxembourg. LSB holds Erasmus accreditation for the period of 2021 – 2027.

Campus

The Luxembourg School of Business campus is located at the Château de Septfontaines and the former porcelain manufactory Faïencerie Villeroy & Boch, a historical area close to the center of Luxembourg City.

Faculty
LSB Faculty Members cooperate with business schools and universities around the world.

References

Education in Luxembourg City
Business schools in Luxembourg
Educational institutions in Luxembourg